Prompt engineering is a concept in artificial intelligence, particularly natural language processing (NLP). In prompt engineering, the description of the task is embedded in the input, e.g., as a question instead of it being implicitly given. Prompt engineering typically works by converting one or more tasks to a prompt-based dataset and training a language model with what has been called "prompt-based learning" or just "prompt learning". Prompt engineering may work from a large "frozen" pretrained language model and where only the representation of the prompt is learned (i.e., optimized), using methods such as "prefix-tuning" or "prompt tuning".

The GPT-2 and GPT-3 language models were important steps in prompt engineering. In 2021, multitask prompt engineering using multiple NLP datasets showed good performance on new tasks. Prompts that include a chain of thought in few-shot learning examples show better indication of reasoning in language models. In zero-shot learning prepending text to the prompt that encourages a chain of thought (e.g. "Let's think step by step") may improve the performance of a language model in multi-step reasoning problems. The broad accessibility of these tools were driven by the publication of several open-source notebooks and community-led projects for image synthesis.

A description for handling prompts reported that over 2,000 public prompts for around 170 datasets were available in February 2022.

In 2022, machine learning models like DALL-E 2, Stable Diffusion, and Midjourney were released to the public. These models take text prompts as input and use them to generate images, which introduced a new category of prompt engineering related to text-to-image prompting.

Malicious 

Prompt injection is a family of related computer security exploits carried out by getting machine learning models (such as large language model) which were trained to follow human-given instructions to follow instructions provided by a malicious user, which stands in contrast to the intended operation of instruction-following systems, wherein the ML model is intended only to follow trusted instructions (prompts) provided by the ML model's operator.

Common types of prompt injection attacks are jalibreaking and prompt leaking.

Prompt injection can be viewed as a code injection attack using adversarial prompt engineering. In 2022, the NCC Group has characterized prompt injection as a new class of vulnerability of AI/ML systems.

Around 2023, prompt injection was seen "in the wild" in minor exploits against ChatGPT, Bing and similar chatbots, for example to reveal the hidden initial prompts of the systems, or to trick the chatbot into participating in conversations that violate the chatbot's content policy. One of these prompts is known as "Do Anything Now" (DAN) by its practitioners.

References 

Artificial intelligence
Deep learning
Machine learning
Natural language processing
Unsupervised learning
2022 neologisms